Mystery at Castle House is a 1982 Australian film for children. The film was broadcast in the United Kingdom on the ITV network in 1986

Plot
With their father tied up with a long-term business contract, siblings Kate and Ben move in with their aunt. As they explore their new surroundings, they meet and befriend a local boy named Spider. They also encounter Rocco and Ah Leong, who are stealing produce from the shops and households.

Kate, Ben and Spider eventually decide to explore Castle House, a mysterious huge manor that has been abandoned for 15 years. However, they soon discover that the house has inhabitants: An old lady named Miss Markham, to whose family the house belongs; her new ground caretaker Mr. Wilberforce; and his two dimwitted aides Morris and Stakovich. While Miss Markham proves to be very friendly, Mr. Wilberforce and his men strive to keep the children away from the grounds. After the children's visit, Miss Markham discovers that Wilberforce and his men are keeping her own cellar locked up; and when she decides to investigate, the men overpower her and tie her up.

On their way back to the house's jetty, Ben, Kate and Spider discover a secret tunnel to the house, and in it they run into Rocco and Ah Leong. As the two boys disclose, Ah Leong's father was kidnapped by Wilberforce and his goons to help them in a break-in, since he is supposed to disable the security system, and is kept captive in Castle House's cellar. The children try to free Mr. Leong, but only succeed in alerting Wilberforce about their knowledge of his plans, and with the robbery about to take place this very day, the gangsters decide to speed up their plans. The children do what they can to slow down Wilberforce's plans, and manage to free Miss Markham. Using Miss Markham's personal high-power speedboat, they catch up with the gangsters, overpower them and free Mr Leong.

Cast
Simone Buchanan as Kate
 Jeremy Shadlow as Spider
 Scott Nicholas as Ben
Aileen Britton as Miss Markham
Henri Szeps as Mr. Wilberforce
 John Cobley as Morris
Ray Meagher as Stakovich
 Robert Geammel as Rocco
 Tony Lee as Ah Leong
 Ron Mee Lee as (Ah Leong's) Father
 Robin Bowering as Mr. Gaspari, Rocco's father
Carole Skinner as Aunt Josephine

References

External links

1982 films
Australian children's films
1980s children's films
1980s English-language films
Films directed by Peter Maxwell